Noukafou is a neighborhood of Lomé, Togo.

Neighborhoods of Lomé